The Clark International Sports Complex is a complex of sports venue in Mabalacat, Pampanga, Philippines.

It is part of The Villages at Global Clark development.

Facilities
The Clark International Sports Complex hosts eight sporting fields: Two professional baseball field with Major League Baseball dimensions, four wheel wagon baseball fields suitable for both training and competition use, and two multi-purpose fields which can be used to host football and rugby matches.

The sports complex grounds also has a  jogging path, a beach volleyball area, a  multipurpose hall, and an open-air pavilion adjacent one of the two professional baseball fields.

Events
Primarily a baseball venue, the Clark International Sports Complex has hosted the 2016 Asia Pacific Senior League Baseball. It is also capable of accommodating softball events having hosted the 2018 Asian Junior (under-19) Women's Softball Championship.

It will also host the baseball and softball events of the 2019 Southeast Asian Games.

References

Sports complexes in the Philippines
Buildings and structures in Pampanga
Baseball venues in the Philippines